Mesmerized by the Sirens is the second studio album by the darkwave band Black Tape for a Blue Girl. It was released on vinyl in 1987 by Projekt Records.  "The Sawdust Scattered" was remixed for the later cassette and CD versions.

Track listing

Personnel 
 Sam Rosenthal – Piano (tracks 2, 10), Electronics, Lyrics, Artwork
 Oscar Herrera – Vocals (tracks 2, 7, 8, 9)
 Sue-Kenny Smith – Vocals (tracks 1, 2, 10), Guitar (tracks 1, 3, 10)
 Walter Holland – Guitar (tracks 2, 5), Vocals on track 4
 Allan Kraut – Drums (tracks 4, 7, 9)
 Bridget Knott – Vocals on track 3
 Kim Prior – Vocals on track 9
 Thomas Anthony (2) – Piano on track 9
 Richard Watson – Clarinet on track 8
 Miira Ojanen – Voice (tracks 4, 10)
 Bobbi Jo Gamble – Voice on track 2
 Dimitri Patakidis – Voice on track 10
 Chris Sommovigo – Voice [Synth] on track 2

Sources 

Black Tape for a Blue Girl albums
Projekt Records albums
1987 albums